Foglia may refer to:
 Foglia, a river in the Marche region of Italy
 Montecalvo in Foglia, a municipality in the Marche region of Italy
 13147 Foglia, a main-belt asteroid

People 

 Alejandro Foglia
 Adriano Foglia
 Andrea Foglia
 Joe Foglia
 Leonard Foglia
 Mario Foglia 
 Pietro Foglia